The Mesabi Daily News was a daily newspaper published in Virginia, Minnesota. It had a Sunday circulation of 10,000. The Mesabi Daily News was one of the oldest surviving businesses in Virginia. It was located at 704 7th Ave South. As of 2018, the chief editor was Jerry Burnes and the Regional Operations/General Manager/Advertising Director was Chris Knight, a member of the Virginia Rotary Club, the Northern Club and the YMCA. In 2020, the paper was merged with the Hibbing Daily Tribune as the Mesabi Tribune.

History
The newspaper was founded in 1893 as the Virginia Enterprise and switched to its current name in 1945. The very first editor of the paper was named R. McGarry, who was succeeded by D. A. Cuppernoll in 1895.

In 2014, Adams Publishing group acquired 34 papers, including the Daily News, from American Consolidated Media.

In 2020 it was combined with the Hibbing Daily Tribune to create the Mesabi Tribune.

References

External links 
Mesabi Daily News Online
Mesabi Daily News on Facebook
Adams Publishing Group

Newspapers published in Minnesota
Publications established in 1893